Ergo Proxy is a Japanese cyberpunk anime television series, produced by Manglobe, directed by Shūkō Murase and written by Dai Satō. The series ran for 23 episodes from February to August 2006 on the Wowow satellite network. It is set in a post-apocalyptic utopian future where humans and AutoReiv androids coexist peacefully until a virus gives the androids self-awareness, causing them to commit a series of murders. Inspector Re-L Mayer is assigned to investigate, discovering a more complicated plot behind it that involves a humanoid species known as "Proxy" who are the subject of secret government experiments.

The series, which is heavily influenced by philosophy and Gnosticism, features a combination of 2D digital cel animation, 3D computer modeling, and digital special effects. After its release in Japan, the anime was licensed for a DVD release by Geneon Entertainment, with a subsequent television broadcast on Fuse in the United States. The show was also distributed to Australian, British and Canadian anime markets. Since its release, Ergo Proxy has received mostly favorable reviews which praised its visuals and themes.

Synopsis

Setting
The series is set in a post-apocalyptic, dystopian future. After an ecological disaster thousands of years prior rendered the outside world inhospitable towards life, domed cities were built as safe havens for the population. Inside these domes, one of which is Romdeau city (where the series takes place), humans and androids called AutoReivs coexist peacefully. Romdeau city government adopted a bureaucracy system, in which the government is divided between several entities such as the Intelligence Bureau, the Information Bureau, the Health & Welfare Bureau, and the Security Bureau, all under the control of the Administration Bureau led by an Administrator referred to as the "Regent".

The primary AutoReiv types are referred to as either "Companion"—(AutoReivs who physically possess a human-like appearance)—or "Entourage"—(AutoReivs with a robotic appearance)—depending on their role. There are others designed for leisure or combat; AutoReivs seem to be constructed of varying degrees of bio-cybernetic complexity to fit their specific functions. The humans in the city are grown in artificial wombs but are still biologically related to their ancestors. Throughout the series, it is shown that the humans living in the domes believe they cannot reproduce naturally. Likewise, when a new person is grown, they are done so to fulfill a specific purpose, thus ensuring that person's role in society through a "raison d'être".

Plot
A series of murders committed by AutoReivs infected with the Cogito virus (which causes them to become self-aware) begins to threaten the delicate balance of Romdeau City's social order. Behind the scenes, the government has been conducting secret experiments on a mysterious humanoid life form called "Proxy"; these Proxy beings (often described as god-like and immortal) are said to hold the very key to the survival of humanity.

Re-l (pronounced  or "Ree-EL"; also represented by the spelling "R.E.A.L." in the Romdeau citizen database) Mayer, the Regent's granddaughter, is assigned to investigate the murders with her AutoReiv partner, Iggy. She encounters two unknown and highly powerful humanoids. She later learns that these humanoids are the Proxies. The other central character, an immigrant named Vincent Law, is revealed to be connected in some ways with the Proxies. After being hunted down, Vincent temporarily lives in a commune on the outside of the dome. During the massacre of the commune by Raul Creed of the Security Bureau, Vincent leaves the area for Mosk, his birthplace, in an attempt to recover his memories. Re-l later rejoins him to try to discover the truth behind the Proxies and the domes. It is revealed among other things that domes are all created by Proxies and cannot function without their presence within the domes.

Production

Ergo Proxy was directed by Shūkō Murase with Dai Satō serving as chief writer and Naoyuki Onda as character designer. The anime was originally announced at the MIP TV Trade Show in France as a 23-episode TV series. Manglobe initially approached Shūkō Murase with a bare-bones vision for a futuristic detective thriller, which included the title, a plot outline for episodes 1–3 and a design concept for Romdeau. Beyond that they let him develop the idea towards a more existentialist slant.
"There was almost too much freedom", he laughs. "A show slated to be on a commercial network carries restrictions according to the time slot", he explains. "Sponsors often have requests intended to help propel the work to hit status; and merchandising entails another set of requirements altogether. By comparison, all Ergo Proxy had to deal with was a DVD release and a TV broadcast over a pay satellite channel."

When asked about how he devised the title Ergo Proxy, Satō simply replied "[I]t sounds cool". Murase explained he originally wanted to use the concept of everyone having another self inside of themselves: the idea that there are two personalities inside a person and noted that René Descartes' phrase "cogito, ergo sum" was the inspiration for it. Satō stated that they originally did not want to explicitly express the concepts of Gnosticism in the anime. However, their personal beliefs ended up reflecting the ideas of Gnosticism and realized how well these terms fit and decided to use them.

At first they intended to have Vincent as the leading protagonist and Re-l as a supporting character; however, as they fleshed out her character, she became a much stronger character and began to steal the spotlight from Vincent. This gave them the opportunity to split the narrative between the two characters instead of having a single protagonist lead the story.

Media

Anime

In Japan, Ergo Proxy aired on pay-TV satellite broadcasting network WOWOW from 25 February 2006, concluding on August 12, 2006. Ergo Proxy was then released by Geneon Entertainment onto nine DVD volumes from May 25, 2006, to January 25, 2007. The series was licensed by Geneon Entertainment for Region 1 release, which began on November 21, 2006, and spanned six volumes. The English dub of Ergo Proxy premiered on pay-TV channel Fuse from June 9 to November 24, 2007, in the United States. and a complete DVD collection was later released in December 2008.

On July 3, 2008, Geneon Entertainment and Funimation Entertainment announced an agreement to distribute select titles in North America. While Geneon Entertainment still retains the license, Funimation Entertainment assumed exclusive rights to the manufacturing, marketing, sales, and distribution of select titles which included Ergo Proxy. As of March 29, 2012, the series has been fully licensed by Funimation and re-released the series under their Anime Classics label on July 3, 2012. Geneon also released a four-disc complete Blu-ray box collection on September 25, 2012, and two DVD box collection on September 25, 2012, and August 22, 2012, respectively.

In Australia and New Zealand, the Ergo Proxy DVDs were distributed by Madman Entertainment, the first volume released in March 2007. The first volume of Ergo Proxy was released in the United Kingdom by MVM Films on August 6, 2007. The English dub of Ergo Proxy aired on ABC2 (the national digital public television channel) from July 3 to December 4, 2007. In Canada, the English dub aired on pay-TV digital channel G4techTV's Anime Current programming block from July 26 to December 27, 2007.

Manga
A manga spin-off called  was written by Manglobe and illustrated by Yumiko Harao. The manga was serialized in Shogakukan's Monthly Sunday Gene-X from February 18 to November 18, 2006. It was later released in two tankōbon format, the first on August 18, 2006, and the second on February 19, 2007.

Soundtracks

Two soundtracks of the anime series, titled Ergo Proxy OST opus01 and Ergo Proxy OST opus02, have been released by Geneon Entertainment in Japan on May 25, 2006 and August 25, 2006, respectively. Both soundtracks feature compositions of Yoshihiro Ike. The first soundtrack, opus01, contains several tracks including the opening and ending themes: "Kiri" (by Monoral) and "Paranoid Android" (by Radiohead). The second soundtrack, opus02, was initially packaged with a special edition of the first Region 1 DVD.

Reception
Ergo Proxy received mostly positive reviews, with critics praising the series for its intricate visuals, cyberpunk aesthetic and intellectual themes; while criticizing the uneven narrative and its over reliance on philosophical references. Newtype USA stated that they were "excited by the premise of the show, which features complex drama surrounding the strikingly beautiful crime investigator Re-l Mayer, and an intricate sci-fi setting, incorporating robots, living in human society and a grotesque array of unique monsters". Newtype went on to praise the "tremendous supporting cast and carefully woven plot". Newtype USA featured the first Ergo Proxy DVD in their "DVD of the Month", describing it as a "show that rewards viewers with a deep, believable, and above all thoughtful sci-fi story instead of simply bashing robots together". Katherine Luther of About.com praised it for its cyberpunk themes and mix of 2D and 3D animation as well as its deep psychological storyline, calling it creepy, intense and "edge-of-your-seat-delightful".

THEM Anime Reviews praised the visuals and pacing of the plot while noting that the greatest flaw in the series is that the designs can be inconsistent at times. Zac Bertschy of Anime News Network gave it an overall score of B+ and criticized the characters, stating "It's an unfortunate stain on an otherwise excellent series." However, he praised the animation stating "The backgrounds in particular are breathtakingly detailed and beautiful, which is a surprise given the bleak, dystopian surroundings" Carlo Santos, also from Anime News Network, criticized the middle and ending of the anime, stating "Some of the middle episodes fall back on experimental gimmicks and fail to advance the story, while the finale becomes a towering mess as it desperately tries to resolve every single plot point. Even the animation has embarrassing moments of inconsistency." However, Santos continued to state "for trying so hard to scale the heights of a difficult genre, Ergo Proxy still deserves credit. It accomplishes more than most other anime series ever hope to, flaws and all."

IGN contributor D. F. Smith reviewed the series DVD box set in 2008, giving the series a 7.0 out of a possible score of 10. Smith overall found the visuals, music and voice acting of Ergo Proxy to be exceptional, but stated that the overall story was too complex and relied too heavily on philosophical references rather than a strong narrative. In conclusion, D. F. Smith wrote "Ergo Proxy isn't without its share of disappointments, but even so, it has a heck of a lot going for it. What it lacks in the way of a truly gripping, involving story, it makes up for in part with a powerful soundtrack, some powerful visuals, and the occasional powerful insight. If those are the sort of things you go to Japanese animation looking for, you might not find this series disappointing at all". Another IGN columnist, Ramsley Isler, placed Ergo Proxys opening as the 10th greatest anime opening. Isler praised the opening's use of dark visuals juxtaposed with the opening theme song's optimistic tone, comparing it to a Nine Inch Nails or Lifehouse music video.

On June 12, 2015, the Chinese Ministry of Culture announced that they had listed Ergo Proxy among 38 anime and manga titles banned in China.

Notes

References

External links

 

 
 Geneon Ergo Proxy MySpace (English)
 
 

2006 anime television series debuts
2006 Japanese television series endings
Anime with original screenplays
Censored television series
Cyberpunk anime and manga
Existentialist anime and manga
Funimation
Geneon USA
Gnosticism
Japanese adult animated science fiction television series
Madman Entertainment anime
Manglobe
Fiction about memory
NBCUniversal Entertainment Japan
Neo-noir television series
Neo-noir
Philosophical anime and manga
Post-apocalyptic animated television series
Post-apocalyptic anime and manga
Psychological thriller anime and manga
Seinen manga
Shogakukan manga
Television censorship in China
Television series about artificial intelligence
Works banned in China
Wowow original programming